"Tak som chcela všetkých milovať" is a song by Marika Gombitová released on OPUS in 2007.

The composition was originally written by Vašo Patejdl and Kamil Peteraj for the 2003 musical Adam Šangala (based on Ladislav Nádaši-Jégé's novel). Gombitová recorded the song as the only new track to promote her retrospective compilation entitled Vyznanie, reaching at number twenty on the Slovak Airplay Chart.

In addition, the single was remixed by Jaroslav Šimek, and released as a free download single in 2008.

Official versions
 "Tak som chcela všetkých milovať" - Original version, 2007
 "Tak som chcela všetkých milovať (Jarek Šimek Remix)" - Remixed version, 2008

Credits and personnel
 Marika Gombitová - lead vocal
 Vašo Patejdl - writer
 Kamil Peteraj - lyrics

Charts

References

General

Specific

External links 
 

2007 songs
Marika Gombitová songs
Songs written by Kamil Peteraj
Slovak-language songs